"Real Men Love Jesus" is a song recorded by American country music artist Michael Ray. It was released on September 14, 2015, as the second single from Ray's major-label debut album.  The song was written by Brad Warren, Brett Warren, Lance Miller and Adam Sanders.

Critical reception
Country music blog Taste of Country reviewed the single favorably, saying that "Fans of Michael Ray’s 'Real Men Love Jesus' will argue that the song is what the country is missing. The Florida-raised singer sings of strong family values and a commitment to hard work before allowing a little room for true love and a good time."

Music video
The music video was directed by Sam Siske and premiered in December 2015.

Chart performance

Weekly charts

Year-end charts

References

2015 songs
2015 singles
Country ballads
2010s ballads
Michael Ray (singer) songs
Atlantic Records singles
Warner Records Nashville singles
Songs written by Lance Miller
Songs written by the Warren Brothers
Song recordings produced by Scott Hendricks
Songs about Jesus